Nicholas or Nick Brady may refer to:
Nicholas Brady (poet) (1659–1726), Irish divine and poet
Nicholas Frederic Brady (1878–1930), American businessman and philanthropist
Nicholas F. Brady (born 1930), American banker and Secretary of the Treasury
Nicholas Brady (died 2012), victim in the Byron David Smith killings